Nikolay Dimitrov (born 15 October 1987) is a former Bulgarian professional footballer who played as a winger.

Career

Levski Sofia
Born in Ruse, Nikolay Dimitrov started growing his football abilities in Levski Sofia's Youth academy. Dimitrov took his league bow for Levski in 2004–05 season, making seven substitute appearances in his first campaign. He made his senior debut on 6 August 2004, in a 3–1 win over Slavia Sofia, as an 89th-minute substitute for Emil Angelov.

In the following season Dimitrov scored his first and second goals for the club, during a 6–1 win over Rodopa Smolyan on 30 April 2006. His first start came against Belasitsa Petrich in the final game of the A PFG season on 30 May.

Dimitrov became a regular starter during the 2007–08 season. He ended that season with 8 league goals in 29 matches. With Levski Dimitrov has won three A PFG titles, two Bulgarian Cups and three Bulgarian Supercups.

Kasımpaşa S.K.
On 17 May 2010, Dimitrov together with his teammate Georgi Sarmov signed for Kasımpaşa S.K. for five years. He made his Süper Lig debut on 14 August 2010, in a 0–0 away draw against Gaziantepspor. On 27 October, Dimitrov scored a penalty in a 4–1 Turkish Cup win over Menemen Belediyespor. On 20 November, he scored his first Süper Lig goal against Gençlerbirliği. During the season, he earned 23 league appearances and scored two goals. However, Dimitrov and his Kasımpaşa team mates were relegated at the season's end.

During 2011–12 season he scored 12 goals in the TFF First League. His goals helped the team reach the promotion playoffs for the Süper Lig. On 19 May 2012, Dimitrov scored in a 2–0 away win against Konyaspor in the first leg of the play-offs semi-final. Four days later, en route to the play-off final, he scored the first goal, his fourteenth of the season, in Kasımpaşa's 3–0 home win over Konyaspor. On 27 May he played 120 minutes in the play-off Final against Adanaspor. Kasımpaşa won the match 3–2 after extra time with goals from Gökhan Güleç, Adem Büyük and Azar Karadas sending them back to the Süper Lig after a one season absence.

Slavia Sofia
Dimitrov joined Slavia Sofia on 29 September 2016.

Ural Yekaterinburg
On 10 June 2020, his club FC Ural Yekaterinburg announced that his contract was terminated by mutual consent as Dimitrov decided to retire from playing.

International career
He made his debut for Bulgaria national football team on 6 February 2008 in a friendly match against Northern Ireland, a game in which Bulgaria won with a score of 0–1. Dimitrov came on as a substitute and played during the second half of the match. In November 2016, he was recalled to the national side (after a long absence from international duty) for a 2018 World Cup qualifier against Belarus, during which he remained on the bench.

Career statistics

Club

1 Includes Bulgarian Supercup matches, promotion playoffs for the Turkish Süper Lig and relegation playoffs for the Russian Premier League

International goals
Bulgaria score listed first, score column indicates score after each Dimitrov goal.

Honours

Club
Levski Sofia
A PFG: 2005–06, 2006–07, 2008–09
Bulgarian Cup: 2006–07
Bulgarian Supercup: 2005, 2007, 2009

References

External links
 
 
 Nikolay Dimitrov at LevskiSofia.info

1987 births
Living people
Bulgarian footballers
Association football midfielders
Bulgaria under-21 international footballers
Bulgaria international footballers
First Professional Football League (Bulgaria) players
Süper Lig players
TFF First League players
Super League Greece players
Russian Premier League players
PFC Levski Sofia players
Kasımpaşa S.K. footballers
Samsunspor footballers
Boluspor footballers
Manisaspor footballers
Xanthi F.C. players
PFC Slavia Sofia players
FC Ural Yekaterinburg players
Bulgarian expatriate footballers
Expatriate footballers in Turkey
Bulgarian expatriate sportspeople in Turkey
Expatriate footballers in Greece
Bulgarian expatriate sportspeople in Greece
Expatriate footballers in Russia
Bulgarian expatriate sportspeople in Russia
Sportspeople from Ruse, Bulgaria